Sohni Mahiwal   is a 1984 Indo-Russian historical romance drama film  based on the story of Sohni Mahiwal,  directed by Umesh Mehra and Latif Faiziyev (Russia), produced by F. C. Mehra. It stars Sunny Deol, Poonam Dhillon and Zeenat Aman in pivotal roles. The writers were Shanti Prakash Bakshi and Javed Siddiqui.  The music was scored by Anu Malik. Choreographer P. L. Raj.

Plot
Shahzada Izzat Beg (Sunny Deol) comes to India with his caravan from Bukhara Uzbekistan and settles in a town in Punjab. Here he falls in love with Sohni (Poonam Dhillon), who keeps a shop in metal pots. Izzat Beg buys a pot from her with whatever money he had and they were attracted to each other. Sohni dispensed with her servant and kept Izzat Beg instead. This gave them more opportunity to meet. This was a scandal in the town and Sohni was perforce married to Rehman, who was slightly off his head. Sohni continued meeting Izzat Beg, who went out fishing. When the atmosphere became too hot for them they jointly took a watery grave for their love.

Cast
 Sunny Deol as Shahzada Izzat Beg
 Poonam Dhillon as Sohni
 Zeenat Aman as Zarina
 Tanuja as Sohni's Mother
 Pran as Tulla (Sohni's Father)
 Shammi Kapoor as Peer Baba
 Gulshan Grover as Noor
 Rakesh Bedi as Salamat
 Frunzik Mkrtchyan as Warrior

Soundtrack
The music of the film was composed by Anu Malik, while lyrics were written by Anand Bakshi.

Track listing

Awards
32nd Filmfare Awards:

Won

 Best Female Playback Singer – Anupama Deshpande for "Sohni Chinab Di"
 Best Editing – M. S. Shinde
 Best Sound Design – Brahmanand Sharma

Nominated

 Best Music Director – Anu Malik
 Best Lyricist – Anand Bakshi for "Sohni Chinab Di"

See also
 Sohni Mahiwal

References

External links

1980s Hindi-language films
1984 multilingual films
1980s historical romance films
1984 films
Films based on Indian folklore
Films scored by Anu Malik
Soviet multilingual films
Indian multilingual films
Indian historical romance films
Films directed by Umesh Mehra